Al-Ajman or al-'Ijman (singular Ajmi ) is an Arabian tribal confederation in the Arabian Peninsula, with Ajman spread across Saudi Arabia, Qatar, the United Arab Emirates and Kuwait.

Origin

Al-Ajman is a Qahtanite Arab tribe that is descended from Banu Yam tribe. Most of Ajman left their nomadic life and lived in northeastern of Saudi Arabia.

History

The Ajman were noted for being important players in the politics of eastern Arabia in the 18th and early 20th centuries. Their most famous leader (or sheikh) during the 19th-20th century was Rakan bin Hithlain, who is still well known in Arabian tribal lore. He was noted for his poetry and is often known as the maternal grandfather of the current Crown Prince of Saudi Arabia Mohammed bin Salman. In 1861 the Ajman were defeated by Faisal bin Turki, the Imam of the Second Saudi State, after challenging his rule in the 1850s. Faisal bin Turki later married into the tribe. Later they supported the cause of the Saud Al Kabir branch of the Al Saud against their cousin Abdulaziz bin Saud, the founder of Saudi Arabia.

A section of the Ajman led by Dhaydan bin Hithlain joined the Ikhwan movement in 1900, providing military support for Ibn Saud, but later rebelled against him.  The Ajman and their allies from the tribes of Utaybah and Mutayr were defeated by Ibn Saud in 1929 in the Battle of Sabilla, which put an end to the Ikhwan rebellion.

Nearly all the Ajman have abandoned nomadic life and have settled in the Persian Gulf states, particularly the eponymous Emirate of Ajman, a member of the United Arab Emirates. There are also many in Saudi Arabia. Their main tribal territory is Joudah, also known as Wadi el-Ajman ("the valley of the Ajman"), located on the road between Riyadh and Dammam.

Ajman attacked the Sobyie tribe in 1764 who called on Ibn Saud to protect them from Ajman tribe. Ibn Saud responded immediately and killed 50 and captured 240 persons of Ajman. Rakan bin Hithalayn sent two of his sons to Banu Yam in Najran asking them for help. Najran was nightmare for Ibn Saud at that time. Sheikh Hassan bin Hebat Allah was the religious leader of Yam. He responded to Ajman's request and called for the general mobilization to Adderyah in Riyadh with 500 men on 500 black horses (one of their techniques in war). Yam's reputation was terrifying every single tribe at the time which pushed the Qahtan tribe to build an alliance with them. Yam arrived in Riyadh joined Ajman and moved to Adderyah. Ibn Saud had 3700 men but Sheikh Mohammed bin Abdulwahab warned Mohammed bin Saud asking him to make peace with Yam, but he fought them and was defeated. Yam's army killed about 390 men, captured 220 men and got the Ajman prisoners back from Ibn Saud. Ibn Saud had to make peace with Yam so that Yam would go back to Najran and Ajman would stay in Najd under Yam's full protection. Ibn Saud knew that Yam would keep their word and fight to defend it so he was not worried about them once they'd made peace. This battle was named Al-Ha'ir.

References

Tribes of Arabia
Tribes of Saudi Arabia
Tribes of the United Arab Emirates
Qahtanites
Arab groups
Bedouin groups
Tribes of Kuwait